Kkoi Dil Mein Hai is an Indian television romantic comedy series that aired on Sony Entertainment Television. The series premiered in December 2003 and ended its run in 2005. The show starred Eijaz Khan and Poorva Gokhale in lead roles. The opening theme song was sung as a duet by famous singers Shreya Ghoshal and Sunidhi Chauhan. The show garnered some controversy for featuring a scene of marital rape.

Plot
Kajal (Poorva Gokhale) is a simple and bubbly girl from a Gujarati family and best friend of rich and narcissistic Krutika. Their friendship hits rock bottom when they both fall for rich and handsome Samay (Sandeep Baswana), the heir of Punj business empire. Samay reciprocates Kajal's  feelings and they plan to get married. A jealous and deranged Krutika orchestrates a kidnapping and blackmail plot with help of her rich mother and gets Kajal forcefully married to Samay's younger playboy brother Arjun (Eijaz Khan) and herself marries Samay by duping him. Arjun gradually starts falling deeply in love with Kajal and gives up his wild lifestyle. Kajal reluctant at first also falls in love with Arjun. Things get complicated as Samay, still in love with Kajal turns to alcohol to drown his sorrow and hates Krutika refusing to recognize her as his wife. A still deranged Krutika blaming Kajal for her miseries tries to complicate her life. Arjun and Kajal meanwhile have a successful marriage and Kajal gets pregnant and gives birth to their son.

Cast
 Poorva Gokhale as Kajal Arjun Punj (née Agarwal) - Eldest vivacious  daughter of Agarwal family
 Amit Sadh / Eijaz Khan as Arjun Punj - Younger son of Punj family and Kajal's husband
 Sandeep Baswana / Hiten Tejwani as Samay Punj - Kajal's ex flame and Krutika's ex-husband
 Karishma Tanna as Krutika - Samay's obsessive ex-wife and childhood friend of Kajal
 Jennifer Winget as Preeti Agarwal - Kajal's docile younger sister
 Kiran Juneja as Mrs. Punj - Samay and Arjun's Mother
 Suchitra Pillai as Samay and Arjun's Aunt
 Salim Shah as Mr. Punj - Samay and Arjun's Father 
 Eijaz Khan as Sahil - Lookalike of Arjun Punj
 Natasha Rana as Krutika's Mother

References

External links

Balaji Telefilms television series
Indian drama television series
Sony Entertainment Television original programming
2003 Indian television series debuts
2005 Indian television series endings
Television shows set in Pune